Ashraf Kassem Raman  (born 25 July 1966) is a retired Egyptian football player and football manager, currently in charge of Al-Hussein Irbid.

Kasem played as a defender for Zamalek from 1984 to 1997. He also played for Al-Hilal of Saudi Arabia in 1994.

He played for the Egypt national football team from 1986 to 1993, including ten FIFA World Cup qualifying matches. He also played at the 1994 African Cup of Nations.

Titles 

Personal titles
Twice times Egyptian footballer of the year 92 & 1993
Arab footballer of the year 1994
As a player for National Team
Participated in World Cup Squad 1990
1 African Cup of Nation title 1986 (Scored decisive penalty kick in final Vs Cameroon)
1 All Africa Games Gold Medal for Egypt 1987
12 Titles As a player for Zamalek
4 Egyptian League titles
1 Egyptian Cup Titles
3 African Champion League titles
2 African Super Cup titles
1 Afro-Asian Cup title
As a coach for Zamalek
1 Egyptian League title
1 Egyptian Super Cup Title
1 African Cup Winners' Cup

References

External links

 

1966 births
Living people
Egyptian footballers
Egypt international footballers
1990 FIFA World Cup players
1986 African Cup of Nations players
1988 African Cup of Nations players
1992 African Cup of Nations players
1994 African Cup of Nations players
Africa Cup of Nations-winning players
Zamalek SC players
Egyptian football managers
Egyptian Premier League players
Al Hilal SFC players
Saudi Professional League players
Egyptian expatriate footballers
Expatriate footballers in Saudi Arabia
Egyptian expatriate sportspeople in Saudi Arabia
Association football defenders